The Sarajevo City Council (Bosnian: Gradsko vijeće Grada Sarajeva) is a 28-member elected body that scrutinises the activities of the mayor of Sarajevo and has the power, with a two-thirds super-majority, to amend the mayor's annual budget and to reject the mayor's draft statutory strategies. The City Council meets at Vijećnica on the bank of the Miljacka river. The council is also able to publish its findings and recommendations, and make proposals to the mayor.

City Council Members
The City Council comprises 28 City Council Members, including a council speaker, two deputies, and a secretary, elected by each municipal council of municipalities that make up the City of Sarajevo, electing seven delegates to the council from among the municipal councilors, with 15 seats needed for a majority. Elections take place every four years – at the same time as for the rest of Bosnia and Herzegovina.

Bosniaks, Croats and Serbs, as constituent peoples, are individually guaranteed a minimum of 20% of the seats in the City Council, while the group of Others are individually guaranteed at least two seats, regardless of all election results.

Structure of the City Council

Responsibilities
The City Council is responsible for carrying out the policies and decisions:
adopts the City Statute
makes decisions, other regulations and general acts and gives their interpretation
adopts the rules of procedure of the City Council
elects and dismisses the Speaker of the City Council, Deputy Speakers of the City Council, members of the working bodies of the City Council and the Secretary of the City Council
elects and dismisses the Mayor and Deputy Mayors
adopts the budget of the City of Sarajevo and adopts the report on the execution of the budget of the City of Sarajevo and the final account of the budget of the City of Sarajevo at the proposal of the Mayor
adopts development programs for individual activities for which it is responsible
enacts implementing regulations, including zoning
enacts regulations on city taxes and otherwise provides financial resources, in accordance with the law
manages and disposes of the property of the City of Sarajevo
establishes public companies and public institutions and other legal entities to perform economic, social, communal and other activities of interest to the City of Sarajevo
calls a referendum on issues of interest to the City of Sarajevo
announces a public loan and self-contribution and decides on borrowing by the City of Sarajevo
enacts a regulation on the establishment and scope of the administrative body of the City of Sarajevo
gives consent to the rulebook on the internal organization of the administrative bodies of the City of Sarajevo
performs the tasks of the second instance body, which the Mayor decides on the basis of the regulations of the City of Sarajevo
enacts regulations in the exercise of delegated powers
makes decisions on recognitions and awards of the City of Sarajevo
performs other tasks determined by law and the statute

The City Council supervises the work of the administrative bodies of the City of Sarajevo and has the right to gain insight into the implementation of its decisions, especially when it comes to city revenues and expenditures, and for this purpose the City Council can form a commission that can inspect the files in the premises of the City Administration and to submit a report to the City Council on the results of the inspection.

References

External links
Sarajevo City Council

Organizations based in Sarajevo
Politics of Bosnia and Herzegovina
Political organizations based in Bosnia and Herzegovina